Forbidden Sins is an erotic thriller film directed by Robert Angelo. Released on 18 April 2000, it stars Shannon Tweed and Amy Lindsay.

Synopsis

Cast
Shannon Tweed as Maureen Doherty
Corbin Timbrook as David Mulholland
Kirstine Carlstrand as Virginia Hill
Timothy Vahle as Brian Armstrong
Amy Lindsay as Molly Malone
Myles O'Brien as John Doherty

References

External links

1990s erotic thriller films
American erotic thriller films
1999 films
Films with screenplays by Daryl Haney
1990s English-language films
1990s American films